Harold Williams (born 2 September 1959) is a Grenadian cricketer. He played in one first-class match for the Windward Islands in 1980/81.

See also
 List of Windward Islands first-class cricketers

References

External links
 

1959 births
Living people
Grenadian cricketers
Windward Islands cricketers